Helmer Andersson (born 8 September 2001) is a Swedish football defender who plays for Karlslunds IF.

References

2001 births
Living people
Swedish footballers
Sweden youth international footballers
Association football defenders
Örebro SK players
Karlslunds IF players
Allsvenskan players
Ettan Fotboll players